Karen Smith Catlin (born 1963) is an American tech executive and advocate for inclusive workplaces.
She most recently served as a vice president in the Office of the CTO at Adobe Systems.  She is a frequent speaker at technology events.

From 1985 to 1990, Catlin worked as a software developer on the Intermedia system at Brown University. She then joined Macromedia in 1993 as an early employee, initially responsible for product localization. She went on to develop the program management discipline for the company and was promoted to the vice president level, leading shared engineering services across the entire product line. Catlin worked at Macromedia until 2006, when Adobe Systems acquired the company. She was an executive at Adobe Systems from 2006 to 2012, responsible for shared engineering services.

Catlin has published four books: Present! A Techie's Guide to Public Speaking (coauthored with Poornima Vijayashanker (2015); Better Allies: Everyday Actions to Create Inclusive, Engaging Workplaces (2019); Belonging in Healthcare: The Better Allies® Approach to Creating More Inclusive Workplaces (2022); and The Better Allies™ Approach to Hiring (2020).

References

External links
 

American women writers
Brown University alumni
Computer scientists
Living people
1963 births
21st-century American women